The Wellington Caves are a group of limestone caves located  south of Wellington, New South Wales, Australia.

History 
The Wellington region was long inhabited by the 'Binjang mob' of the Wiradjuri people. While there is no direct evidence that they entered any of the caves at Wellington, there is indirect evidence that they were well aware of them. A picture painted by Augustus Earle around 1826 (see image at right) clearly shows Aboriginal people in front of a fire at the entrance to Cathedral Cave; although labelled 'Mosman's Cave', it is clearly the entrance to Cathedral Cave  and such is the first written record of the caves.

First Europeans
The first Europeans to explore the caves were probably associated with Lieutenant Percy Simpson's settlement (1823–1831), but the first written account was provided by explorer Hamilton Hume in 1828. Two years later George Ranken, a local magistrate, found fossil bones of both a diprotodon and a giant kangaroo in the caves. The diprotodon, which has been dated to the Pleistocene period was herbivorous and its teeth were well adapted to grazing.

Ranken returned later that year with Sir Thomas Mitchell and collected a huge variety of bones from the caves which appear to have acted as a natural trap for fauna. These remains became the subject of an address by Mitchell to the Geological Society of London in 1831.

Since that time the cave has been a steady source of information about ancient geology and fauna  especially when Gerard Krefft, Curator of the Australian Museum, conducted two separate extensive excavations (in 1866 and 1869) and collected many significant fossil specimens for the museum  although collapses and other geological phenomena have splintered and scattered skeletons.

Natural Reserve
The caves were frequently vandalised during the nineteenth century until 1884, when they were declared a natural reserve. Organised tours of Cathedral Cave began about 1885 with the appointment of the first caretaker, James Sibbald. Gaden Cave was discovered in 1902 and developed in 1909. The Phosphate Mine was in production from 1914 to 1918 however only 6000 tons of rock with limited amounts of phosphate were removed. The mine passages, mostly backfilled and collapsed, lay dormant for almost 80 years until they were reconstructed and reopened for tours in 1996. Cathedral Cave, Gaden Cave and the Phosphate Mine are shown as guided tours.

Over many years, members of the Sydney University Speleological Society (SUSS) have mapped extended and discovered new sections of caverns in the area. There has been particular emphasis by SUSS cave diving.  There are now 26 in the reserve. The most important discoveries have been McCavity Cave, a subterranean lake under Limekiln Cave and the rediscovery of Anticline Cave that had in the past been buried in the Wellington Caves Caravan Park.

Geology
The caves at Wellington are located in an outcrop of Early Devonian limestone, which is about 400 million years old. That limestone is part of the Garra Formation.

Tourism
By 1888 over 1,500 people a year were visiting them. As of 2005, over 50,000 people visit the caves annually.

Caves

Cathedral Cave 
Cathedral cave opened for guided tours in 1885. Cathedral Cave is famous for its huge stalagmite known as Altar Rock which is 32 metres in circumference at its base and over 15 metres high.

An excavation at this site discovered an unknown species of bat that occupied the cave during the Pliocene epoch, several million years ago, and is related to the modern carnivore Macroderma gigas (ghost bat). The species was named Macroderma koppa in reference to Koppa, a spirit that was reported by indigenous informants to inhabit the cave.

Gaden Cave 
Gaden Cave opened for guided tours since 1909. Gaden Cave is noted for its unusual and beautiful cave coral. It is named after the shire president at the time that the cave was discovered.

Phosphate Mine 
Phosphate Mine opened for guided tours since 1996. Apart from viewing the old workings, visitors can see 800,000-year-old deposits containing fossil bones.

Other Caves 
Other caves in the Wellington caves are not open for tourism.

Lime Kiln Cave 
Lime Kiln Cave is the name given to the dry part of a large cave system, most of which is completely water-filled.

McCavity 
McCavity is the under-water section of the cave which was discovered by members of the Sydney University Speleological Society.

Water Cave (Anticline Cave) 
This is a small doline cave leading to water. It is in the process of being re-opened.

Big Sink 
This is an old collapsed doline. It appears to be the route through which fossil-bearing sediments washed into the chambers below.

Mitchell's Cave 
This is the site from which the first Australian fossils for scientific study were collected by George Ranken.

Notes

References
 Krefft, G (1866), (Mr. Krefft’s Report on the Fossil Remains found in the Caves of Wellington Valley, made to the Honorable. T. A. Murray, President of the Legislative Council of New South Wales), The Sydney Mail, (Saturday, 22 December 1866), p.2. 
 Anon (1870), The Wellington Caves, The Sydney Mail, (Saturday, 26 November 1870), p.15. 
 Krefft, G. (1870), Guide to the Australian Fossil Remains, Exhibited by the Trustees of The Australian Museum, and arranged and named by Gerard Krefft, F.L.S., Curator and Secretary, Sydney: F. White, Government Printer.
Mike Augee, Chris George and Bruce Welch, Wellington Caves, Wellington Caves Fossil Studies Centre 2008 .
Kent Henderson, The Wellington Caves and Abercrombie
Joan Starr and Doug McMillan, The Wellington Caves. Treasure Trove of Fossils, Dubbo, Macquarie Publications, 1985.

External links 

Sydney University Speleological Society (SUSS) is a Sydney-based speleological society

Central West (New South Wales)
Show caves in Australia
Limestone caves
Protected areas of New South Wales
Caves of New South Wales
Dubbo Regional Council